Timothy Charles Stanceu (born 1951) is a Senior judge of the United States Court of International Trade.

Biography
Stanceu was born in 1951 in Canton, Ohio to Romanian parents Charley and Marian Stanceu (née Coman). His father Charley was a baseball pitcher for the New York Yankees and Philadelphia Phillies. Stanceu received an Artium Baccalaureus degree in 1973, from Colgate University. He received a Juris Doctor in 1979, from Georgetown University Law Center. He worked as a program analyst and environmental protection specialist for the United States Environmental Protection Agency from 1974 to 1982. He served as special assistant to the assistant secretary in the Office of Enforcement and Operations of the United States Department of the Treasury from 1982 to 1985. He served as Deputy Director of the Office of Trade and Tariff Affairs for the Treasury Department from 1986 to 1989. He worked in private practice in Washington, D.C. from 1990 to 2003.

Trade Court service

On January 7, 2003, President George W. Bush nominated Stanceu to serve as a Judge for the United States Court of International Trade, to the seat vacated by Judge Richard W. Goldberg. He was confirmed by the Senate on March 6, 2003, and received his commission on March 10, 2003. He was elevated to Chief Judge on July 1, 2014, after Donald C. Pogue assumed senior status. Stanceu assumed senior status on April 5, 2021.

References

External links
FJC Bio
Chief Judge Timothy C. Stanceu Biography on U.S. Court of International Trade website
Presidential Nomination: Timothy Charles Stanceu

1951 births
Living people
21st-century American judges
American people of Romanian descent
Colgate University alumni
Georgetown University Law Center alumni
Judges of the United States Court of International Trade
Lawyers from Canton, Ohio
United States federal judges appointed by George W. Bush